Pteris lydgatei is a rare fern species in the Pteridoideae subfamily of the Pteridaceae.  It is known by the common name Lydgate's brake and is endemic to Hawaii, where it is known from the islands of Oahu, Molokai, and Maui. It was once thought to be extinct until it was rediscovered in the 1990s. There are fewer than 40 individuals in the wild. This is a federally listed endangered species of the United States.

References

External links
USDA Plants Profile

lydgatei
Plants described in 1897
Endemic flora of Hawaii
Native ferns of Hawaii
Critically endangered flora of the United States